General elections were held in Zambia on 28 September 2006 to elect a President, members of the National Assembly and local government councillors. The result was a victory for the ruling Movement for Multi-Party Democracy, which won 75 of the 150 National Assembly seats and whose candidate, Levy Mwanawasa, won the presidential vote. Voter turnout was just over 70%.

Campaign
During the campaign, Patriotic Front leader Michael Sata was strongly critical of Chinese investment in the country and suggested that he would recognize the Republic of China (Taiwan). One opinion poll in September gave Sata a considerable lead over Mwanawasa, 52% to 27%, with Hakainde Hichilema in third place at 20%, but Mwanawasa questioned these results. Another poll earlier in the month gave Mwanawasa the lead with 33% to Sata's 24%, although this marked a drop from the 45% reported for Mwanawasa by a previous poll in August, and an increase for Sata, who had been at 15%.

Former president Kenneth Kaunda backed Hichilema and expressed disapproval for Sata. Former president Frederick Chiluba urged people to vote for Sata.

The possibility was raised that Sata could be disqualified from the election for allegedly giving a false declaration of assets in August; he had claimed that a former minister in Mwanawasa's government owed him $100,000.

Results
The winner of the presidential elections was determined in one round according to the first-past-the-post system. Initial results from the election gave Sata the lead, but further results put Mwanawasa in first place and pushed Sata into third place. Interim results released after votes from 120 of 150 constituencies were counted put Mwanawasa on just over 42% of the vote; Hakainda Hichilema had 28%; and Michael Sata had slipped to 27%. When opposition supporters heard that Sata had slipped from first to third place, riots erupted in Lusaka. According to interim results Mwanawasa still held an easy lead in constituencies counted up to 16:00 on 1 October.

Late in the afternoon of 2 October, the Zambian Electoral Commission announced that Mwanawasa had officially won the election with 43% of the vote; Sata took second place with 29% and Hichilema took third place with 25%. He was sworn in for another term on 3 October.

The total electorate was 3,941,229 and 2,789,114 votes were cast of which 48,936 were spoilt. Voter turnout was 70.77%.

President

National Assembly
The elections in Lupososhi (19,230 registered voters) and Kabompo East (16,148) were postponed due to the death of candidates. Both seats were won by the MMD when the delayed elections were held.

See also
List of members of the National Assembly of Zambia (2006–11)

References

External links
Zambia Votes 2006 BBC News

General
Elections in Zambia
Zambia
Presidential elections in Zambia
Zambia